Saysana is a surname. Notable people with the surname include:

Lembo Saysana (born 1995), Laotian footballer
Sopha Saysana (born 1992), Laotian footballer